Ballet Des Moines is a ballet company based in Des Moines, Iowa.

History
The company was founded in 2002 as the Ballet Theatre of Iowa. Previously, the city had been served for by Ballet Iowa for three decades; however, that company had gone defunct in 1997 following financial mismanagement Ballet Des Moines staged its first show, The Nutcracker, that winter and its first spring show, Swan Lake and Divertimento, the following spring.

In 2005, Serkan Usta, a longtime star of Tulsa Ballet, was named artistic director. In 2006, the company renamed itself Ballet Des Moines. In 2012, the company hired its own professional resident dancers for the first time.

In November, 2021, Tom Mattingly was named Artistic Director of Ballet Des Moines.

Performances
Ballet Des Moines perform at various locations in Des Moines, most often at Hoyt Sherman Place and the Civic Center of Greater Des Moines.

Education and development
Ballet Des Moines II, formed in 2009, is a corps of pre-professional dancers who represent the organization through community outreach events and public performances. In addition, Ballet Des Moines offers classes for students ages 13–18. The annual production of The Nutcracker uses more than 350 local young dancers.

Dancers
As of 2021, the company has eight professional dancers:
Amelia Grubb Hillman
Logan Hillman
Chiyo Nishida 
Cameron Miller
Kate Anderson
Rune Houchin
Savannah Cox
Noah Klarck

See also
 List of ballet companies in the United States

References

External links
 Ballet Des Moines Official Site

Ballet companies in the United States
2002 establishments in Iowa
Performing groups established in 2002
Dance in Iowa
Culture of Des Moines, Iowa